Brevennia rehi, the rice mealybug, is a species of true bug in the family Pseudococcidae. It is a pest of sorghum and kodo millet in India.

References

Pseudococcidae
Insect pests of millets